Friends is a collaborative album by South African jazz trumpeter Hugh Masekela and American jazz pianist Larry Willis. The album is the long-awaited sequel to Almost Like Being in Jazz released in 2005. Recorded in Pretoria, Friends premiered in Cape Town at the Mahogany Room in April 2012. It is a four-piece album, a 39-track boxset reworking of American jazz standards, released on the new record label, House of Masekela.

References

External links

2012 albums
Hugh Masekela albums
Collaborative albums